Western Sydney Wanderers FC is an Australian soccer team who currently play in the A-League, the national domestic soccer competition. Colloquially known as Western Sydney, it was founded in 2012 as the tenth member of the then nine-team league. The A-League competition consists of a regular season and a finals series of the top six teams, with the Premiership being awarded to the club who finishes on top of the table in the regular season, and the championship to the winner of the grand final. Winning either of those trophies qualifies a club for the AFC Champions League. In 2014, Football Federation Australia started the FFA Cup, a knock-out cup competition based along the lines of England's FA Cup.

The Wanderers immediately won its first premiership, finishing on top in 2012–13, but they lost the grand final to Central Coast Mariners. They finished second place in 2013–14 and 2015–16, but lost the grand final to respectively Brisbane Roar and Adelaide United. The Wanderers were qualified for the 2014 AFC Champions League due to their premiership and surprisingly won the final against Al-Hilal FC. They also were qualified for the 2014 FIFA Club World Cup, finishing sixth.

This list includes players who have made at least one on-field appearance (either as a starting player or as a substitute) for the Wanderers in a competitive match. Friendly matches are not included. The Wanderers have had several players compete for them who have been capped at international level, before, during or after their time with the team.

Records

Key
 The list is ordered first by date of debut, and then if necessary in alphabetical order.
 Appearances as a substitute are included.
 Statistics are correct up to and including the match played on 12 August 2020. Where a player left the club permanently after this date, his statistics are updated to his date of leaving.

Players

Players highlighted in bold are still actively playing at Western Sydney Wanderers.

Captains

International players
Players who have represented their national team at senior level before, during or after playing for the Wanderers.
First Cap column indicates whether their first cap for their respective country came before they joined the club,
during their time at the club or after they left the club. Players in bold are currently at the club. Correct as of 17 March 2018.

Notes
  Beauchamp was the club captain from 2012 to 2014.
  Topor-Stanley was the club captain from 2014 to 2016.
  Dimas was the club captain from 2016 to 2017.
  Cornthwaite was the club captain from 2017 to 2018.
  Mark Bridge was the club captain from 2018 to 2019
  Mitchell Duke was the club captain from 2019 to 2020

References
General
 
 

Specific

External links
 Official website

Western Sydney Wanderers FC players
Western Sydney Wanderers
Association football player non-biographical articles